Saint-Jacques was a provincial electoral district in the Montreal region of Quebec, Canada.

It corresponded to part of the Le Plateau-Mont-Royal and Ville-Marie areas of Montreal.

It was created for the 1966 election from parts of Montréal–Saint-Jacques, Montréal–Sainte-Marie and Montréal–Saint-Louis electoral districts.  Its final election was in 1985.  It disappeared in the 1989 election and its successor electoral district was Sainte-Marie–Saint-Jacques.

Members of the Legislative Assembly / National Assembly

Election results

References
 Election results (National Assembly)
 Election results (QuebecPolitique.com)

Saint-Jacques